The 2007 Kilkenny Senior Hurling Championship was the 113th staging of the Kilkenny Senior Hurling Championship since its establishment by the Kilkenny County Board in 1887. The championship began on 15 September 2007 and ended on 28 October 2007.

Ballyhale Shamrocks were the defending champions.

On 6 October 2007, Mullinavat were relegated from the championship following 1–11 to 0–13 defeat by Young Irelands.

On 28 October 2007, Ballyhale Shamrocks won the championship after a 1–20 to 1–10 defeat of St. Martin's in the final. It was their 11th championship title overall and their second title in succession.

Kevin Power from the Fenians club was the championship's top scorer with 1-29.

Team changes

To Championship

Promoted from the Kilkenny Intermediate Hurling Championship
 Mullinavat

From Championship

Relegated to the Kilkenny Intermediate Hurling Championship
 Erin's Own

Results

First round

Relegation play-off

Quarter-finals

Semi-finals

Final

Championship statistics

Top scorers

Top scorers overall

Top scorers in a single game

References

External links
 2007 Kilkenny SHC results

Kilkenny Senior Hurling Championship
Kilkenny